Medrano is a station on Line B of the Buenos Aires Underground. The station was opened on 17 October 1930 as part of the inaugural section of the line between Federico Lacroze and Callao.

Overview 
It is located in the Almagro barrio, at the intersection of Avenida Corrientes and Avenida Medrano, and named after the latter.

It is the nearest subway station to the National Technological University and the Hospital Italiano de Buenos Aires.

References

External links 

Buenos Aires Underground stations
Railway stations opened in 1930
1930 establishments in Argentina